The 2017 European Rally Championship was the 65th season of the FIA European Rally Championship, the European continental championship series in rallying. The season was also the fifth following the merge between the European Rally Championship and the Intercontinental Rally Challenge. Kajetan Kajetanowicz was the reigning champion and went on to win the third straight ERC title.

This season, the European Junior Championship is split into two new categories. ERC Junior U27, which totals six events, is for drivers born on or after 1 January 1990 competing in R2 cars on Pirelli tyres. With the best four rounds counting, the winner will receive a career progression fund worth 100,000 euros to use in ERC Junior U28 in 2018. 

ERC Junior U28 offers the next step on the rallying pyramid for drivers born on or after 1 January 1989. Again totalling six rounds with the best four scores counting, drivers use R5 cars with no restriction on tyre choice. The champion will get a drive on a European round of the 2018 FIA World Rally Championship as a P1 driver in a 2016-specification World Rally Car.

Calendar

The calendar for the 2017 season features only eight rallies compared to the previous season. Rallies dropped from the calendar were Circuit of Ireland, Ypres Rally and Rally Estonia. New event is the Rally di Roma Capitale.

Teams and drivers

ERC

ERC-2

ERC-3

ERC Junior U27

Ladies Trophy

Results

Championship standings

Points Systems

ERC, ERC-2, ERC-3, ERC Junior U28, ERC Junior U27 and Ladies Trophy
 For both the Drivers' and Teams' championships of the ERC, ERC-2 and ERC-3, only the best seven results will be retained by each driver or team.
 For both the Drivers' and Teams' championships of the ERC Junior U28, the ERC Junior U27 and the Ladies Trophy, only the best four results will be retained by each driver or team.
 Points for final position are awarded as in following table:

 Bonus points awarded for position in each Leg

Drivers' Championships

ERC

ERC-2

ERC-3

Ladies Trophy

ERC Junior U28

ERC Junior U27

Teams' Championships

References

External links
 

 
2017 in rallying
Rally
2017